Kidian Diallo (born 1 January 1944) is a Malian former professional football manager, and player who played as a midfielder. As a player, he represented the Mali national team, and he managed them from 1982 to 1989.

References

External links
 

1944 births
Living people
People from Sikasso Region
Malian footballers
Mali international footballers
Malian football managers
Mali national football team managers
Djoliba AC players
AS Real Bamako players
Malian Première Division players
Association football midfielders
21st-century Malian people
African Games silver medalists for Mali
African Games medalists in football
Competitors at the 1965 All-Africa Games